The Police Complaints Authority (PCA) was an independent body in the United Kingdom with the power to investigate public complaints against the Police in England and Wales as well as related matters of public concern. It was formed in 1985, replacing the Police Complaints Board and was then itself replaced by the Independent Police Complaints Commission (IPCC) in April 2004.

The IPCC was itself pre-dated by the Office of the Police Ombudsman for Northern Ireland. This agency was set up in 2000 to investigate complaints against the Royal Ulster Constabulary and its successor the Police Service of Northern Ireland (PSNI). It had its own teams of civilian investigators and was completely independent of the Police. In addition to the PSNI it also covered the Belfast Harbour Police and the Larne Harbour Police, the Belfast International Airport Constabulary, and the MoD Police (not the same as the Royal Military Police). Unlike the IPCC the Ombudsman's office could investigate an incident without waiting for a referral or complaint.

Investigations
The PCA asked the West Yorkshire Police to investigate the activities of the West Midlands Serious Crime Squad in 1989. It reported in 1994.

See also
Police Complaints Authority (New Zealand)

External links
 IPCC
 Police Ombudsman

References

Police oversight organizations
Defunct public bodies of the United Kingdom
Law enforcement in England and Wales
Regulators of the United Kingdom
1985 establishments in the United Kingdom
Organizations established in 1985